Myles P. O'Connor was a college football player; a quarterback for the Vanderbilt Commodores football team from 1895 to 1896. One of the highest honors that a student could achieve was the "Bachelor of Ugliness;" O'Connor won this award in 1897.

References

American football quarterbacks
Vanderbilt Commodores football players
19th-century players of American football